Hudson Valley Horrors Roller Derby (HVHRD) is a women's flat track roller derby league based in Hyde Park, New York. Founded in 2006, the league consists of two teams which compete against teams from other leagues. Hudson Valley is a member of the Women's Flat Track Derby Association (WFTDA).

The league describes itself as "the world's first non-urban, flat-track women's roller derby league".  Founded in 2006, it held its first home bout in June 2007, against Pioneer Valley Roller Derby.

The league was accepted into the Women's Flat Track Derby Association Apprentice Program in November 2009, and became a full member of the WFTDA in December 2010.  It has close links with the Hudson Valley Frightmares junior roller derby league.

References

Hyde Park, New York
Roller derby leagues established in 2006
Roller derby leagues in New York (state)
Women's Flat Track Derby Association Division 3
2006 establishments in New York (state)